The Rolls-Royce Eagle Mk XXII  is a British 24-cylinder, sleeve valve, H-block aero engine of 46 litre (2,807 cubic inches) displacement. It was designed and built in the early-1940s by Rolls-Royce Limited and first ran in 1944. It was liquid-cooled, of flat H configuration with two crankshafts and was capable of 3,200 horsepower (2,387 kW) at 18 psi boost.

Design and development
The Rolls-Royce design team realised that producing a scaled-up version of their Griffon V-12 engine would lead to excessively large combustion chambers and problems with detonation. The team concluded that a larger number of small cylinders would be the answer and considered an X-24 design. This layout had previously caused unreliability with the Rolls-Royce Vulture due to the need to fasten four connecting rods in a complicated arrangement to a common big end bearing.

The designers finally settled on an 'H' layout with two crankshafts and 'blade and fork' connecting rod attachments, the crankshafts being connected through the propeller speed reduction unit. The new engine followed the layout of the Napier Sabre and similarly used sleeve valves but with a simplified drive system.

A two-speed, two-stage supercharger and intercooler were used to compress then cool the air-fuel mixture, following Griffon and Merlin practice. Starting was by Coffman starter. An auxiliary shaft driven by the lower crankshaft operated the main coolant pump, intercooler coolant pump, pressure and scavenge oil pumps and a fuel injection pump. Piston ring failures and cylinder head sealing problems were experienced during early flight testing.

Applications
The Eagle was never fitted to a production front-line fighter, as it was overshadowed by a new wave of turbojet engines, such as the Rolls-Royce Derwent and turboprops such as the Dart and Armstrong Siddeley Python. Fifteen Eagle 22s were produced to power prototypes of the Westland Wyvern fighter/torpedo bomber because of delay in the development of the Python.

Variants
46H Eagle I
(1944) - Compression ratio 6.5:1.

46H Eagle II
(1944) - Modified Eagle I.

46H Eagle (20 srs) 22
(1946-1949) - Increased compression ratio (7:1), 3,500 hp at 3,500 rpm and 28 lb boost. Fifteen engines produced at the Derby Rolls-Royce factory. First flown in a Westland Wyvern on 16 December 1946.

Engines on display
An Eagle 22 with some of the cowling panels removed to display the engine can be seen fitted to Westland Wyvern TF1, VR137, at the Fleet Air Arm Museum, RNAS Yeovilton. This pre-production aircraft never flew.

Specifications (Eagle 22)

See also

References

Notes

Bibliography

 Gunston, Bill. World Encyclopedia of Aero Engines (5th Edition). Phoenix Mill, Gloucestershire, UK: Sutton Publishing Limited, 2006. 
 Lumsden, Alec. British Piston Engines and their Aircraft. Marlborough, Wiltshire: Airlife Publishing, 2003. .
 Rubbra, A.A. Rolls-Royce Piston Aero Engines - a designer remembers: Historical Series no 16 :Rolls-Royce Heritage Trust, 1990.

External links

A working Rolls-Royce Eagle 22 model engine
Additional pictures of the same model engine
Photo of a Rolls-Royce Eagle 22
The Eagle-engined Wyvern TF.Mk.1 VR137
"Rolls-Royce Eagle" a 1947 Flight article

Eagle 22
Sleeve valve engines
1940s aircraft piston engines